The canton of Loué is an administrative division of the Sarthe department, northwestern France. Its borders were modified at the French canton reorganisation which came into effect in March 2015. Its seat is in Loué.

It consists of the following communes:
 
Amné
Auvers-sous-Montfaucon
Avessé
Bernay-Neuvy-en-Champagne
Brains-sur-Gée
Brûlon
Chantenay-Villedieu
La Chapelle-Saint-Fray
Chassillé
Chemiré-en-Charnie
Chevillé
Conlie
Coulans-sur-Gée
Crannes-en-Champagne
Cures
Degré
Domfront-en-Champagne
Épineu-le-Chevreuil
Fontenay-sur-Vègre
Joué-en-Charnie
Lavardin
Longnes
Loué
Maigné
Mareil-en-Champagne
Mézières-sous-Lavardin
Neuvillalais
Noyen-sur-Sarthe
Pirmil
Poillé-sur-Vègre
La Quinte
Ruillé-en-Champagne
Saint-Christophe-en-Champagne
Saint-Denis-d'Orques
Sainte-Sabine-sur-Longève
Saint-Ouen-en-Champagne
Saint-Pierre-des-Bois
Saint-Symphorien
Tassé
Tassillé
Tennie
Vallon-sur-Gée
Viré-en-Champagne

References

Cantons of Sarthe